General National Maritime Transport Company, more commonly known as GNMTC, is a Libyan State Owned Company which was founded in 1975, with a total capital of 1.2 billion US Dollars. GNMTC is based in Tripoli, Libya, with subsidiaries in Malta and Hong Kong.

GNMTC trades world-wide through its present fleet of various types of vessels which includes Crude Oil Carriers, Product and Chemical Carriers, and LPG Carriers.

Cruise ship
On June 4, 2010 a letter of intent was signed between STX France and GNMTC, to build one 140,000 Gross tonnage cruise ship similar to the existing MSC Cruises Fantasia class ships MSC Fantasia, and MSC Splendida. During construction, the Libyan Civil War broke out on 15 February 2011. In June 2011, STX France cancelled the contract, and began looking for a new buyer of the hull. It was announced on March 13, 2012, that MSC had reached an agreement to buy the ship for 550 million euros, and be named MSC Preziosa.

Current fleet
GNMTC Fleet

Suezmax

Aframax

Medium range tankers (MR)

Handysize

Small size

LPG

Former Fleet List

References

External links
Lloyd’s List 
BIMCO 
International Association of Independent Tanker Owners

Tankers
Transport companies established in 1975
Companies of Libya
1975 establishments in Libya
Government-owned companies of Libya
Economy of Tripoli, Libya